The Hour of the Thin Ox is a novel by Colin Greenland published in 1987.

Plot summary
The Hour of the Thin Ox is a novel in which balloons, primitive guns, and low-tech biological warfare are used.

Reception
Dave Langford reviewed The Hour of the Thin Ox for White Dwarf #91, and stated that "Greenland's real story begins in the southern jungle at about chapter 12, and continues into mystery beyond the end of the book: yet I don't think there's to be a sequel. Odd."

Reviews
Review by Faren Miller (1986) in Locus, #308 September 1986
Review by Pauline Morgan (1987) in Fantasy Review, July-August 1987
Review by Paul Brazier (1987) in Vector 139
Review by David V. Barrett (1989) in Foundation, #44 Winter 1988/89

References

1987 novels